Franco Interlenghi (29 October 1931 – 10 September 2015) was an Italian actor.

He made his acting debut at 15 in Vittorio De Sica's  1946 Neorealist film Sciuscià. He has worked with great directors such as Alessandro Blasetti in Fabiola, Roberto Rossellini in Viva l'Italia! and Il generale della Rovere, Federico Fellini in I vitelloni, Michelangelo Antonioni in I vinti, Mauro Bolognini in La notte brava and Luchino Visconti in his stage adaptation of Death of a Salesman. He also appeared in international films, such as Joseph L. Mankiewicz's The Barefoot Contessa, Julien Duvivier's Le petit monde de don Camillo, Charles Vidor's A Farewell to Arms and the Italian-American co-production Ulysses, directed by Mario Camerini.

With his wife, Antonella Lualdi, he had two children, one of whom is actress Antonellina Interlenghi. Franco Interlenghi died on 10 September 2015, aged 83.

Filmography
 
Sciuscià (1946) - Pasquale Maggi
Fabiola (1949) - Corvino
Domenica d'agosto (1950) - Enrico
Teresa (1951) - Mario (uncredited)
Parigi è sempre Parigi (1951) - Franco Martini
Little World of Don Camillo (1952) - Mariolino della Bruciata
Ergastolo (1952) - Stefano Lulli
Processo alla città (1952) - Luigi Esposito
Sunday Heroes (1952) - Marini
 Giovinezza (1952) - Mario
Don Lorenzo (1952) - Franco
La provinciale (1953) - Paolo Sartori
Il mondo le condanna (1953) - Franco
Riscatto (1953) - Roberto Biasetti
I vitelloni (1953) - Moraldo Rubini
I Vinti (1953) - Claudio
The Story of William Tell (1953) - Hans
Cavalcade of Song (1953) - Il notaio
Amori di mezzo secolo (1954) - Mario (segment "L'amore romantico")
100 Years of Love (1954) - Enrico Adamoli aka Rico (segment "Garibaldina")
Canzoni di mezzo secolo (1954)
The Barefoot Contessa (1954) - Pedro Vargas
Ulysses (1954) - Telemachus
The Two Orphans (1954) - Knight Roger de Vaudrey
The Lovers of Manon Lescaut (1954) - Enrico des Grieux
Non c'è amore più grande (1955) - Mario
Gli innamorati (1956) - Franco
Altair (1956) - Farini
I giorni più belli (1956) - Gianni Valentini
Totò, Peppino e i fuorilegge (1956) - Alberto
Padri e figli (1957) - Guido Blasi
A Farewell to Arms (1957) - Aymo
La regina della povera gente (1957)
La cenicienta y Ernesto (1957) - Ernesto
Giovani mariti (1958) - Antonio
The Sky Burns (1958) - Ferri
En cas de malheur (1958) - Mazzetti
Educande al tabarin (1958)
Polikuska (1958) - Pjotr
Cigarettes, Whiskey and Wild Women (1959)
Sangue sull'asfalto (1959) - Antonio Pasquali (uncredited)
General della Rovere (1959) - Antonio Pasquali (uncredited)
La Notte brava (1959) - Bellabella
Match contro la morte (1959) - Le gangster
Le svedesi (1960) - Peppino
Viva l'Italia (1961) - Giuseppe Bandi
Cronache del '22 (1961) - Franco (segment Incontro al mare) 
Una notte per cinque rapine (1967) - Maurice
The Column (1968) - Optimus - Centurion
Totò story (1968)
Pianeta Venere (1972)
La polizia interviene: ordine di uccidere (1975) - Colombo
Amore, piombo e furore (1978) - Hank Sebanek
Miranda (1985) - Carlo
Juke box (1985)
Il Camorrista (1986) - Don Saverio
L'avaro (1989) - Mastro Giacomo
Pummarò (1989)
Se non avessi l'amore (1991, TV Movie) - Padre Robotti
Le amiche del cuore (1992) - Tribodi
L'urlo della verità (1992) - Avvocato Santi (uncredited)
Gli assassini vanno in coppia (1992)
Antelope Cobbler (1993)
Torta di mele (1993)
Copenhagen fox-trot (1993)
L'orso di peluche (1994) - Le directeur du musée
18.000 giorni fa (1994)
Le Roi de Paris (1995) - Bellières
Marciando nel buio (1996) - Sindaco
Mi fai un favore (1996) - Mario
Racket (1996)
La rumbera (1998) - Castillo
Tre addii (1999, TV Movie)
Padre Pio: Between Heaven and Earth (2000, TV Movie) - Padre Graziano
Una lunga lunga lunga notte d'amore (2001) - Luigi Settembrini, Marcello's friend
Il conte di Melissa (2001) - Il Prete
John XXIII: The Pope of Peace (2002, TV Movie) - Radini Tedeschi
Due volte Natale (2003)
The accidental detective (2003) - Nardini
Tosca e altre due (2003) - Sciarrone
Romanzo criminale (2005) - Barone Rosellini
Nemici per la pelle (2006)
Notte prima degli esami – Oggi (2007) - Luigi
I, Don Giovanni (2009) - Padre di Annetta
La bella società (2010) - Papà di Romolo (final film role)

References

External links
 

1931 births
2015 deaths
Male actors from Rome
Italian male film actors
Italian male child actors
20th-century Italian male actors
21st-century Italian male actors
People of Lazian descent